Zeme Naga may refer to:
 Zeme people
 Zeme language